David Boies (born March 11, 1941) is an American lawyer and chairman of the law firm Boies Schiller Flexner LLP. Boies rose to national prominence for three major cases: leading the U.S. federal government's successful prosecution of Microsoft in United States v. Microsoft Corp., his unsuccessful representation of Democratic presidential candidate Al Gore in Bush v. Gore, and for successful representation of the plaintiff in Hollingsworth v. Perry, which invalidated California Proposition 8 banning same-sex marriage. Boies has also represented various clients in US lawsuits, including Theranos, tobacco companies, Harvey Weinstein, and Jeffrey Epstein's victims including Virginia Roberts Giuffre.

Early life
Boies was born in Sycamore, Illinois, to two teachers, and raised in a farming community. He has four siblings. His first job was when he was 10 years old—a paper route with 120 customers. Boies has dyslexia and he did not learn to read until the third grade.

Journalist Malcolm Gladwell has described the unique processes of reading and learning Boies experienced due to his dyslexia. Boies's mother, for instance, would read stories to him when he was a child and Boies would memorize them because he could not follow the words on the page.

In 1954, the family moved to California. Boies graduated from Fullerton Union High School in Fullerton, California. Boies attended the University of Redlands from 1960 to 1962, received a B.S. degree from Northwestern University in 1964, a J.D. degree magna cum laude from Yale Law School in 1966 and an LL.M. degree from New York University School of Law 1967; he was awarded an honorary LL.D. from the University of Redlands in 2000.

He currently serves on the board of trustees of the National Constitution Center in Philadelphia, which is a museum dedicated to the U.S. Constitution.

Professional history

Law firm
Boies was an attorney at Cravath, Swaine & Moore, where he started upon law school graduation in 1966 and became a partner in 1973. He left Cravath in 1997 when a major client objected to his representation of the New York Yankees even though the firm itself had found no conflict. He left the firm within 48 hours of being informed of the client's objection and created his own firm with his friend Jonathan Schiller, now known as Boies, Schiller & Flexner LLP. It is currently rated 23rd in "overall prestige" and 15th among New York law firms by Vault.com, a website on legal career information.

Notable cases

 Boies lost the first important file-sharing case which ultimately put Napster into bankruptcy.
 He represented the Justice Department in the United States v. Microsoft Corp. case. Boies won a victory at trial, and the verdict was upheld on appeal. The appellate court overturned the relief ordered (breakup of the company) back to the trial court for further proceedings. Thereafter, the George W. Bush administration settled the case. Bill Gates said Boies was "out to destroy Microsoft". In 2001, the Washington Monthly called Boies "a brilliant trial lawyer", "a latter-day Clarence Darrow", and "a mad genius" for his work on the Microsoft case.
 Also at Cravath, Boies defended CBS in the libel suit Westmoreland v. CBS from 1984 to 1985, but after dragging on for two years, the case was dropped.
Following the 2000 U.S. presidential election, he represented Vice President Al Gore in Bush v. Gore. In Jay Roach's Recount, which focuses on the case, Boies is played by Ed Begley Jr.
In 2006, Boies, Schiller & Flexner LLP negotiated a major settlement with The American International Group on behalf of its client, C. V. Starr, a firm controlled by Maurice R. Greenberg, the former chairman and chief executive of A.I.G. In 2015 Boies won at trial a claim that the government's $85 billion bailout of AIG had been unfair to the company's owners. Boies has appealed, asking for greater money damages.
Boies negotiated on behalf of American Express two of the highest civil antitrust settlements ever for an individual company: $2.25 billion from Visa, and $1.8 billion from MasterCard.
Boies is representing filmmaker Michael Moore regarding a Treasury Department investigation into Moore's trip to Cuba while filming for Sicko.
On June 24, 2009, following the California Supreme Court ruling on Strauss v. Horton, Boies joined former Solicitor General Theodore Olson, the opposing attorney in Bush v. Gore, in the lawsuit Perry v. Brown seeking to overturn the state of California's Proposition 8 ban on same-sex marriage. In August 2010, the District Court judge ruled in their clients' favor, finding Proposition 8 to be unconstitutional. On June 26, 2013, the Supreme Court of the United States ruled that the proponents of Proposition 8 did not have standing to challenge the ruling, allowing the District Court judgment to stand. Same-sex marriages resumed in California on June 28, 2013.
Boies, Schiller & Flexner LLP assisted the government in obtaining a $155 million settlement from Medco Health Solutions related to a qui tam complaint which alleged that Medco helped some pharmaceutical companies make more money by driving prescriptions to them; along with making the payment Medco also signed a corporate integrity agreement.
On August 20, 2009 the Golden Gate Yacht Club announced that he had been retained in their ongoing dispute with Société Nautique de Genève regarding the 33rd America's Cup.
In March 2010, Boies joined the team of attorneys representing Jamie McCourt in her divorce from Los Angeles Dodgers owner Frank McCourt.
Boies was part of the legal team representing the National Football League in their antitrust litigation, Brady v. NFL.
Boies represented the National Basketball Players Association during the 2011 NBA lockout. He joined sides with Jeffrey Kessler, who opposed Boies as a representative for the players in the 2011 NFL lockout.
Boies was the lead counsel for Oracle Corporation in its lawsuit against Google on the use of Java programming language technology in the Android operating system. The case decided that Google did not infringe on Oracle's patents.
 In 2012, Boies represented three tobacco companies, Philip Morris USA Inc., R.J. Reynolds Tobacco Co. and Liggett Group LLC, in their appeal of a $2.5 million Tampa jury verdict in the death of smoker Charlotte Douglas.
 In late 2012, Boies defended Gary Jackson, former president of Academi (previously known as BlackWater), in a federal prosecution which alleged he and his co-defendants illegally hid firearm purchases from the Bureau of Alcohol, Tobacco, Firearms and Explosives.
 In 2015, Boies represented Bob Weinstein and Harvey Weinstein in renegotiating the Weinsteins’ employment contract.
 In February 2016, Boies agreed to both sit on the board of directors and act as the attorney for troubled Silicon Valley startup Theranos. The controversial dual role was deemed difficult as he would have to represent both the company (as lawyer) and investors (as a director). In the 2022 Hulu miniseries The Dropout, Boies was portrayed by Kurtwood Smith.
 In 2017, Boies agreed to join the legal team for Lawrence Lessig's legal fight against winner-take-all Electoral College vote allocations in the states.
 Dallas Cowboys owner Jerry Jones hired Boies in 2017 to advise on Jones's legal strategy against NFL commissioner Roger Goodell and the NFL compensation committee in the wake of the suspension of running back Ezekiel Elliott.
 Presently, Boies represents several of Jeffrey Epstein's victims including Virginia Roberts Giuffre.

Criticism
In his 2001 book, prosecutor and author Vincent Bugliosi criticized Boies' abilities as a trial lawyer, arguing that Boies "wasn't forceful or eloquent at all in making his points" in Bush v. Gore. "[A]lthough he seemed to have a very good grasp of the facts, he seemed completely incapable of drawing powerful, irresistible inferences from those facts that painted his opposition into a corner".

In 2017, Boies' firm reportedly directed the Israeli private intelligence company Black Cube to spy on alleged victims of Harvey Weinstein's sexual abuse and on reporters who were investigating Weinstein's actions. Over the course of a year, Weinstein had Black Cube and other agencies "target", or collect information on, dozens of individuals, and compile psychological profiles that sometimes focused on their personal or sexual histories. “Boies personally signed the contract directing Black Cube to attempt to uncover information that would stop the publication of a Times story about Weinstein’s abuses, while his firm was also representing the Times, including in a libel case.”

Months after Cyrus Vance Jr. dropped an investigation into a sexual assault allegation against Harvey Weinstein he received a $10,000 donation from Boies who was representing Weinstein at the time. Andrew Cuomo opened an investigation into Vance's handling of the Weinstein probe. However, after receiving a $25,000 campaign donation from Boies' firm Cuomo ended the investigation.

Boies' firm was representing The New York Times at the same time. A few days after The New Yorker broke the story "Harvey Weinstein's Army of Spies", The New York Times announced it had "terminated its relationship" with Boies' firm. According to its contract with Weinstein, Black Cube's assignment had been to kill the paper's negative reporting on Weinstein.

Boies helped Weinstein fend off journalist Ken Auletta's inquiry into Weinstein's alleged rape of Rowena Chiu at the Venice Film Festival in 1998.

According to The Wall Street Journal, Boies negotiated Harvey Weinstein's contract without informing Weinstein Co. directors that he had investment in the company's movies.

Rose McGowan claimed that Jennifer Siebel Newsom attempted to arrange a deal between her and Boies in an attempt to make her stay quiet about her allegations against Harvey Weinstein whom Boies was representing at the time.

Boies features prominently in Bad Blood: Secrets and Lies in a Silicon Valley Startup, a nonfiction book by The Wall Street Journal investigative reporter John Carreyrou about fraud at the blood testing company Theranos. In Carreyrou's reporting, Boies, along with lawyers Heather King and Michael Brille, and his firm are described as protecting the startup using surveillance of witnesses and journalists, weaponized use of non-disclosure agreements and affidavits, intimidation tactics, and other heavy-handed practices. Boies Schiller Flexner LLP is portrayed by Carreyrou as acting as an extension of Theranos, including the use of the law firm's New York offices for hosting promotional meetings such as a faked blood test administered to Fortune writer Roger Parloff. According to Carreyrou, Boies agreed to be paid for his firm's work in Theranos stock, which he expected to grow dramatically in value. He also served on the Theranos board of directors, raising questions about conflicts of interest. Boies’ participation in and support for Theranos directly contributed to the misleading treatment of Walgreen patients, potentially resulting, cited within the report on Theranos by the federal agency CMS (Centers for Medicare & Medicaid Services), in “serious injury or harm, or death”.

Personal life
Boies owns a home in Westchester County, New York, Hawk and Horse Vineyards in Northern California, an oceangoing yacht, and a large wine collection.

Boies is dyslexic. He is frequently described as having a photographic memory that enables him to recite exact text, page numbers, and legal exhibits. Colleagues attribute his courtroom success in part to this ability.

Philanthropy
Professorial chairs:
Daryl Levinson is the "David Boies Professor of Law" at New York University School of Law.
$1.5 million to the Tulane University Law School to establish the "David Boies Distinguished Chair in Law". Two of Boies' children earned their law degrees at Tulane.
A "David Boies Professor" was established at the University of Pennsylvania and is currently held by professor of history Kathleen M. Brown. The professorship is named after David Boies' father, a high school teacher of government and economics.
A "David Boies Chair" at the Yale Law School was formerly held by Professor Robert Post before he became dean of the law school.
David and Mary Boies endowed a chair in government at the University of Redlands, the college that David Boies attended. Arthur Svenson currently holds this chair.
Mary and David Boies also endowed a "Maurice Greenberg Chair" at the Yale Law School.
David Boies and his wife, Mary, donated $5 million to Northern Westchester Hospital, in Mount Kisco, New York. Part of an ongoing capital campaign, the Boieses' money was used to build the hospital's new emergency room.
David and Mary Boies also fund the "Mary and David Boies Fellowships" for foreign students at the Harvard Kennedy School. The Boieses give an annual picnic at their home for the incoming Teach for America corps for New York City (300–500 people). They support the Central European and Eurasian Law Institute (CEELI), a Prague-based institute that trains judges from newly democratized countries in Eastern Europe and the Middle East. There is a "Mary and David Boies Reading Room" at the CEELI Institute in Prague.

Awards and honors
Time magazine named Boies "Lawyer of the Year" in 2000.
Boies received the Golden Plate Award of the American Academy of Achievement in 2014.

References

Cites
Breaking Legal News Featured Author

Articles
Cover story, Forbes: "David Boies Takes on Eliot Spitzer in the Fight over AIG", by Daniel Fisher, Carrie Coolidge and Neil Weinberg, May 9, 2005
Cover story, New York: "The Trials of David Boies Why one Superlawyer has a Hand in Virtually All the High-profile cases of the Day. And How Bush v. Gore became the One that Got Away" by Chris Smith, February 26, 2001
Cover story, New York Times Sunday Magazine: "David Boies: The Wall Street Lawyer Everyone Wants" by Cary Reich, June 1, 1986
Newsweek: "Microsoft's Tormentor: How an affable trial lawyer with an understated canniness is driving Gates & Co. to the wall", March 1, 1999
Vanity Fair: "1999 Hall of Fame", December 1999
The Financial Observer: "The Golden Boies", by Renee Kaplan, September 18, 2000
Vanity Fair: "The Man who ate Microsoft" by David Margolick, March 2000
The National Law Journal: "Lawyer of the Year", January 3, 2000
Esquire: "What Does $750 an Hour Get You? A week in the datebook of David Boies" by Andrew Chaikivsky, May 2003
Vanity Fair: excerpt from David Boies book Courting Justice, September 2004

Books
Courting Justice: From New York Yankees vs. Major League Baseball to Bush vs. Gore, 1997–2000 (Miramax Books, 2004) 
v. Goliath: The Trials of David Boies, by Karen Donovan (Pantheon, 2005)

External links
Biography from Boies, Schiller & Flexner LLP.
Contract signed on July 11, 2017 by law firm Boies, Schiller & Flexner L.L.P. with Black Cube to stop the publication of sexual-misconduct allegations against Harvey Weinstein, The New Yorker, November 2017.

1941 births
American law firm executives
Cardozo School of Law faculty
Harvard Kennedy School people
American LGBT rights activists
Living people
New York (state) Democrats
New York (state) lawyers
New York University School of Law alumni
New York University School of Law faculty
Northwestern University alumni
People from Armonk, New York
People from Sycamore, Illinois
Trial lawyers
Yale Law School alumni
Theranos people
University of Redlands alumni
Cravath, Swaine & Moore partners
Boies Schiller Flexner people
People with dyslexia